This is a list of notable Greek alumni from Oklahoma State University.

Fraternities

Alpha Gamma Rho
 Walter Clore - pioneer in Washington State wine growing; the "father of Washington wine"    
 Allie Reynolds - MLB pitcher   
 Dr. Francis Tuttle - former Director of Oklahoma Department of Career and Technology Education; innovator and pacesetter in vocational education

Beta Theta Pi
 Joe Allbaugh - former Director of FEMA
 Don Nickles - former US Senator

Delta Tau Delta
 Keith Anderson - country music singer
 James Marsden - film actor (X-Men series, The Notebook, 27 Dresses)

Kappa Sigma
 Paul Miller - former president of the Gannett Corporation and the Associated Press; namesake of the OSU School of Journalism and Broadcasting
 Steven W. Taylor - Justice of the Oklahoma Supreme Court

Lambda Chi Alpha
 Chester Gould - creator of the Dick Tracy comic strip

Phi Delta Theta
 William Allen - President and CEO of Phillips Petroleum Co.
 Derrel Gofourth - Oklahoma State and NFL offensive lineman
 Joel Hefley - U.S. Representative

Phi Kappa Tau
 Virgil A. Richard - retired Brig. General, U.S. Army

Pi Kappa Alpha
 Gordon Eubanks - microcomputer pioneer; President and CEO of Symantec and Oblix
 Neal Patterson - founder and CEO of Cerner Corporation
 Rodger Riney - founder and CEO of Scottrade

Sigma Alpha Epsilon
 T. Boone Pickens - oil tycoon and billionaire philanthropist, Pickens Plan

Sigma Chi
 Eddie Sutton - former basketball coach
 Bo Van Pelt - professional golfer
 Charles Watson - founder and former CEO of Dynegy

Sigma Nu
 Tom Coburn - US Senator
 V. Burns Hargis - businessman and former president of Oklahoma State University

Sigma Phi Epsilon
 Edward Clark Gallagher - wrestling coach; namesake of Gallagher-Iba Arena
 John Smith - two-time Olympic Gold medal wrestler; current wrestling coach of OSU

Miscellaneous Greek alumni with OSU ties
 Henry Iba - OSU basketball coach and Athletic Director, Lambda Chi Alpha

External links
 Oklahoma State University Alumni Association
 OSU IFC

Oklahoma State University Greek alumni
Oklahoma State University